The women's hammer throw at the 2018 IAAF World U20 Championships was held at Ratina Stadium on 12 and 14 July.

Records

Results

Qualification
The qualification round took place on 12 July in two groups, with Group A starting at 09:40 and Group B starting at 10:55. Athletes attaining a mark of at least 62.00 metres ( Q ) or at least the 12 best performers ( q ) qualified for the final.

Final
The final took place on 14 July at 13:17.

References

hammer throw
Hammer throw at the World Athletics U20 Championships